is a Japanese historical romance manga series written and illustrated by Kaneyoshi Izumi. The story revolves around Aki, a cheerful princess who is treated coldly by others, despite her royal title. One day, Aki meets Hakusei, a slave boy with golden hair and blue eyes. The two form a bond, overcoming their differences in status; however, danger awaits them.

The manga premiered in Shogakukan's Betsucomi magazine in the November 2007 issue (released on October 13). It was serialized on an irregular basis until the June 2010 issue (released on May 13), after which it was serialized every other month. The final chapter was published in the January 2017 issue (released on December 13, 2016). Shogakukan collected the individual chapters into fifteen bound volumes under the Flower Comics imprint from August 26, 2008, to March 24, 2017. The manga is licensed in France by Kazé Manga.

In 2015, Joō no Hana won the 60th Shogakukan Manga Award for Best Shōjo Manga.

Volumes

Reception
Volume 2 reached the 14th place on the weekly Oricon manga charts and, as of August 1, 2010, has sold 45,260 copies; volume 3 reached the 12th place and, as of January 30, 2011, has sold 42,495 copies; volume 4 reached the 18th place and, as of July 31, 2011, has sold 45,389 copies; volume 5 reached the 17th place and, as of February 5, 2012, has sold 64,506 copies; volume 6 reached the 26th place and, as of August 26, 2012, has sold 33,083 copies; volume 7 reached the 11th place and, as of March 9, 2013, has sold 71,625 copies; volume 8 reached the 19th place and, as of September 1, 2013, has sold 59,147 copies; volume 9 reached the 13th place and, as of March 9, 2014, has sold 67,088 copies; volume 10 reached the 17th place and, as of August 31, 2014, has sold 47,811 copies; and volume 11 reached the 27th place and, as of March 1, 2015 has sold 40,701 copies.

The series has a staff grade of 15.47 out of 20 on the French manga website Manga-News.com.

In 2015, Joō no Hana won the 60th Shogakukan Manga Award for Best Shōjo Manga.

References

External links
 
  

2007 manga
Fantasy anime and manga
Historical anime and manga
Romance anime and manga
Shogakukan manga
Shōjo manga
Winners of the Shogakukan Manga Award for shōjo manga